Rosslyn Academy is a private Christian school in Gigiri, Nairobi, Kenya.  It is an international, coed, day school with a North American curriculum and classes from preschool to twelfth grade.

Enrolment is approximately 650, with a graduating senior class of approximately 60 students each year. Approximately 40 percent of the students are North American, and more than 53 nationalities are represented in the school. Teachers at Rosslyn are typically required to be North American certified, but come from a number of different nationalities, with the majority being North American. The average class size at Rosslyn is 20 students, with a teacher to student ratio of 1:9.

It is located in the northwestern suburbs of Nairobi, in Gigiri, on a beautiful 40 acre campus close to the United States Embassy and the United Nations Headquarters for Africa. The site was originally part of a coffee plantation.

History
The school was founded as Mara Hills Academy by the Eastern Mennonite Mission in northern Tanganyika in the 1940s, as a one-room school for the children of Mennonite missionaries.  The school moved to its current location in 1967, and opened a boarding facility offering K–9 education.

The school remained a boarding school into the 1970s when the Foreign Mission Board of the Southern Baptist Convention (now the International Mission Board) invested in the school to provide an American education for the children of its missionaries residing in the Nairobi area.  This was also a critical financial move in the history of the school as it saved it from financial insolvency. In the late 1980s, the Assemblies of God became the third sponsoring mission.

The school remained strictly a K–9 school until the late 1980s. Most of the students transferred to the Rift Valley Academy upon entering tenth grade. However, the school gradually added a high school program and graduated its first senior class in 1991. Today, the school offers a wide-ranging liberal arts program, including courses in the social sciences, natural sciences, mathematics, literature, world languages, and the arts.  The school also has one of the largest and most successful Advanced Placement AP programs in Africa, typically offering between fifteen and twenty different courses each year, and boasting a pass rate of approximately 85% (25% above the global average).

Accreditation and membership 
Middle States Association of Colleges and Schools (MSA), Association of Christian Schools International (ACSI), Association of International Schools of Africa (AISA), AP/College Board, Child Safety Protection Network (CSPN), International Association for College Admission Counseling (International ACAC)

Fine arts and sports
The school is also now known for its strong fine arts and sports programs. The Rosslyn Eagles consistently place among the top of their leagues in both men's and women's varsity and junior varsity sports.  The inter-schools athletic program includes men's and women's football (soccer), basketball, volleyball, field hockey, rugby, tennis, and swimming.  The Eagles' traditional rivals are the other large international schools in Kenya, namely the Rift Valley Academy Buffalos and the International School of Kenya Lions.

Advanced Placement (AP) Program
Rosslyn offers Advanced Placement (AP) courses in High School. These courses include, among others: 2D Studio Art, Art History, Biology, Calculus AB, Chemistry, English Language, English Literature, European History, French, Physics C: Mechanics, Microeconomics, Psychology, Spanish, Statistics, US History and World History.

In 2020 well over 100 students took at least one AP exam. Of that number, 89% scored at least a “3”. Due to other credit requirements, the majority of students will begin taking AP classes as 10th or 11th grade students. The pass rate for Rosslyn students is historically in the 85th percentile or above (compared to the global average that is typically in the 60th percentile).

University acceptances for Rosslyn students 
Over 95% of Rosslyn Students attend post-secondary education.

Notable Alumni and Former Students 
Mark Wiens - Founder of Migrationology.com, one of the world’s leading food travel vlogs and YouTube channels with over 10 million subscribers and approximately 2 billion views.

Bozoma Saint John - Chief Marketing Officer of Netflix

Brook Hazelton - Former President of Christie’s for North and South America, founder of St. James Partners and President of Digital Reasoning.

Multiple leaders in the fields of humanitarian work, Christian missions, education, medicine, and academia.

Other Information 

 Education in Kenya
 Education in Tanzania
 List of Assemblies of God schools
 List of international schools
 List of schools in Kenya
 List of schools in Tanzania

References

External links 
 , the school's official website

20th-century establishments in Tanzania
1946 establishments in Tanganyika
1967 establishments in Kenya
Boarding schools in Kenya
Assemblies of God schools
Christian schools in Kenya
Educational institutions established in 1946
International schools in Nairobi
Mennonite schools
Private schools in Kenya

Secondary schools in Tanzania
Primary schools in Tanzania
Religious schools in Tanzania